Anna Independent School District is a public school district based in Anna, Texas (USA). In addition to Anna, the district serves parts of Weston as well as the community of Westminster.

History
Anna ISD's original colors were Blue and Gold until the 1950s, when TCU donated old uniforms to AHS.

Upon the closure of Westminster ISD the 1989–90 school year, students from Westminster were annexed into Anna and Van Alstyne ISDs. Conversely, prior to the 2004–05 school year Melissa ISD only educated students through grade 8, so students in that district went to high school at either McKinney High School (before Fall 2000), McKinney North High School (after Fall 2000) or Anna High School.

Due to the district's location along U.S. 75, it has outgrown several schools in its history.

1895- The current Administration Building opened as Anna High School.

1973- The northwest building of the Early Childhood Center opened as a K–8 campus.

1988- The Special Programs Center opened as Anna High School.

On July 1, 1989, the Westminster Independent School District merged into Anna ISD.

1994- The southwest building of the Early Childhood Center opened as a K–5 campus.

1995- The southeast building, a gymnasium, of the Early Childhood Center opened for grades K–8.

1996- The northeast building of the Early Childhood Center opened housing PK and the PK–8 cafetorium.

2000- The current Anna Middle School opened as Anna High School. AMS moved to the 1988 facility, while Anna Elementary School took over the former middle school building.

2005- Joe K. Bryant Elementary opened as a 1−4 campus. PK-K and 5-6 stayed at the current ECC campus.

2007- Sue E. Rattan Elementary opened, with both elementary schools housing PK-5, closing AES.

2011- The current Anna High School opened as a 9−12 campus. AMS moved to its current building and the Special Programs Center is created in its current home.

2013- The Early Childhood Center opened as a PK-K campus, with both elementary schools housing grades 1–5.

2017- Judith L. Harlow Elementary opened at the ECC site in August, replacing the ECC. All 3 elementary schools currently house K−5, while Bryant Elementary also houses PK.

2018- Harlow Elementary moved into its new, permanent school building in January, leaving vacant the former ECC campus. Beginning in November 2017, Anna ISD began a renovation of Coyote Stadium. The updated facility will be ready in Fall 2018 as Anna ISD Stadium, with updated facades on at the entrances, new home stands and press box, and expanded visitor stands.

2019- Anna High School's expanded facility will open, bringing capacity up to 1350. 6th grade will move from Anna Middle School to the former ECC site. AMS will house grades 7-8.

2020- Anna ISD plans on having a bond election to support future growth.

2021- Elementary #4 will open.

2022- Anna High Schools's second expansion will open, bringing capacity up to 1800. Middle School #2 will open, allowing both schools to house grades 6-8.

Additional funded projects with no timeline are a new transportation facility, land purchases (ES #5, 6, & 7; MS #3 & 4; HS #2), and expansions to the Ag Barn and AMS.

At build-out, Anna ISD will have four 1800-capacity high schools, eight 750-capacity middle schools, and sixteen 750-capacity elementary schools.

The district will change to a four day school week in fall 2023.

Finances
As of the 2010–11 school year, the appraised valuation of property in the district was $504,279,000. The maintenance tax rate was $0.104 and the bond tax rate was $0.050 per $100 of appraised valuation.

Academic achievement
In 2011, the school district was rated "recognized" by the Texas Education Agency.  Thirty-five percent of districts in Texas in 2011 received the same rating. No state accountability ratings will be given to districts in 2012. A school district in Texas can receive one of four possible rankings from the Texas Education Agency: Exemplary (the highest possible ranking), Recognized, Academically Acceptable, and Academically Unacceptable (the lowest possible ranking).

Historical district TEA accountability ratings
2011: Recognized
2010: Recognized
2009: Academically Acceptable
2008: Academically Acceptable
2007: Academically Acceptable
2006: Academically Acceptable
2005: Academically Acceptable
2004: Recognized

Schools 
Current Facilities

^1992–93 National Blue Ribbon School

Former Facilities

See also

List of school districts in Texas
List of high schools in Texas

References

External links 
Anna ISD

School districts in Collin County, Texas